Gol Gol Rural District is a rural district (dehestan) in the Central District of Kuhdasht County, Lorestan Province, Iran. At the 2006 census, its population was 12,150, in 2,455 families.  The rural district has 34 villages.

References 

Rural Districts of Lorestan Province
Kuhdasht County